The Plan of Tacubaya, sometimes called the Plan of Zuloaga, was issued by conservative Mexican General Félix Zuloaga on 17 December 1857 in Tacubaya against the liberal Constitution of 1857. The plan nullified the Constitution while it continued to recognize the election of moderate liberal Ignacio Comonfort as President. Conservatives had fiercely objected to the Constitution of 1857, which abolished special privileges of the Catholic Church and the Mexican Army. President Ignacio Comonfort had not been a strong supporter of the Constitution and joined with Zuloaga, commander of the garrison in Mexico City.

Three months after some Mexican states accepted the Plan, the executive called a special session of Congress whose sole mission was to draft a new constitution. The new constitution would be submitted to the electorate for approval where, if ratified, would be promulgated, but if not, it would be redrafted. Its final provision was "all the authorities who do not declare in favor of this Plan shall be discharged." The Congress elected under the new constitution was closed. Comonfort hoped that "by assuming dictatorial powers he could hold the extremists on both sides in check and pursue a middle course." Liberals in Guanajuato and Querétaro did not second the Plan, and in Veracruz, liberals repudiated it. There would be no middle way. Although formally dissolved, congressmen passed a resolution calling for defense of the Constitution. Zuloaga then repudiated Comonfort on 11 January 1858, which led to a three-year civil war between conservatives and liberals.

Presidents of Mexico, recognized by conservatives 1857-1862

See also 

 Reform War

References

Further reading
Scholes, Walter V. Mexican Politics During the Juárez Regime. Columbia MO: University of Missouri Press 1957.

Independent Mexico
Tacubaya
Conservatism in Mexico
1857 in Mexico
1850s in Mexico
1857 documents